Cynthia Dyer is an American attorney who has served as Ambassador-at-Large to Monitor and Combat Trafficking in Persons since January 2023. She formerly served as director of the Office on Violence Against Women from 2007 to 2009.

Education 
Dyer graduated from Texas A&M University and Baylor University Law School.

Career 
Dyer is a prosecutor and a recognized authority on the topic of family violence and sexual assault. Prior to her appointment she was with the Dallas County, Texas, District Attorney's Office. She was the first prosecutor to join the Family Violence Division during its inception in 1994 and became the Chief Prosecutor of that division in 1998. She has received numerous awards and recognition for her service to victims, including the Henry Wade Prosecutor of the Year award from the Greater Dallas Crime Commission, the Equal Justice Award from the Legal Services of NorthWest Texas (Now the Legal Aid of NorthWest Texas), and the Stephen Von Riesen Lecturer of Merit Award from the National College of District Attorneys.

Dyer was nominated to be director of the Office on Violence Against Women by President George W. Bush on August 2, 2007, and confirmed by the United States Senate on December 19, 2007. She served as director from December 2007 to January 2009. As director, Dyer served as the liaison between the Department of Justice and Federal, State and International governments on the crimes of domestic violence, sexual assault, dating violence and stalking. In this role, she was responsible for handling the Department's legal and policy issues regarding the implementation of the Violence Against Women Act and oversaw an annual budget of almost $400 million.

As an active member of her community in Dallas, she has served on the board of the Texas Council on Family Violence, assisted in proposing and drafting legislation to help victims of domestic violence and sexual assault, and volunteered for local organizations, including a non-profit women's shelter.

Biden Administration
On April 22, 2022, President Joe Biden nominated Dyer to serve as Ambassador-at-Large to Monitor and Combat Trafficking in Persons, which leads the Office to Monitor and Combat Trafficking in Persons. Hearings on her nomination were held before the Senate Foreign Relations Committee on November 30, 2022. She was confirmed by the Senate on December 20, 2022, and began serving on January 4, 2023.

References

External links

Living people
Year of birth missing (living people)
American lawyers
Texas A&M University alumni
Baylor University alumni
American women lawyers
21st-century American women